Chasin' Rainbows is the fiftieth studio album by American country music singer Conway Twitty. The album was released in 1985, by Warner Bros. Records.

Track listing

Charts

References

1985 albums
Conway Twitty albums
Warner Records albums